Romantic Comedy 2: Farewell to Bachelorhood is a 2013 Turkish romantic comedy movie and a sequel to Romantic Comedy (2010). The cast of the original movie reprise their roles in this sequel, which was directed by Erol Özlevi.

Plot 
While Esra prepares for marriage with excitement, her best friend Didem starts to panic because she is the only single girl among the group and starts to utilize various tactics to convince her lover Cem to marry her. While Didem waits for a marriage proposal, Cem meets Gözde, who is starring in his new film and becomes focused on his work. Didem, upon entering into crises of jealousy, begins to monitor Cem closely. During this follow-up, she learns that men are at a bachelor party in Antalya "Adam & Eve Hotel". So a funny and romantic adventure begins. Girls infiltrate the hotel in oriental disguise to see what the boys are doing at the bachelor party.

Cast

References

External links 
 
 

2013 films
Films set in Turkey
2010s Turkish-language films
2013 romantic comedy films
Turkish sequel films
Turkish romantic comedy films